Grover Sanders Krantz (November 5, 1931 – February 14, 2002) was an American anthropologist and cryptozoologist; he was one of few scientists not only to research Bigfoot, but also to express his belief in the animal's existence. Throughout his professional career, Krantz authored more than 60 academic articles and 10 books on human evolution, and conducted field research in Europe, China, and Java. He was a member of Mensa and Intertel, high-IQ societies.

Outside of Krantz's formal studies in evolutionary anthropology and primatology, his cryptozoological research on Bigfoot drew heavy criticism and accusations of "fringe science" from his colleagues, costing him research grants and promotions, and delaying his tenure at the university. Further, his articles on the subject were rejected by peer-reviewed scholarly journals. However, Krantz was tenacious in his work and was often drawn to controversial subjects, such as the Kennewick Man remains, arguing for their preservation and study. He has been described as having been the "only scientist" and "lone professional" to seriously consider Bigfoot in his time, in a field largely dominated by amateur naturalists.

Early life and education
Krantz was born in Salt Lake City in 1931 to Carl Victor Emmanuel Krantz and Esther Maria (née Sanders) Krantz. His parents were devout Latter Day Saints often referred to as Mormons, and while Krantz tried to follow the basic Christian philosophy of behaviour and morality, he was not active in the religion. He was raised in Rockford, Illinois until the age of 10, when his family relocated back to Utah. He attended the University of Utah for a year beginning in 1949 before joining the Air National Guard, where he served as a desert survival instructor at Clovis, New Mexico from 1951 to 1952. Krantz then transferred to the University of California, Berkeley, where he completed a Bachelor of Science degree in 1955 and a Master's degree in 1958. With the submission of his doctoral dissertation, titled The Origins of Man, Krantz obtained his doctorate in anthropology from the University of Minnesota in 1971.

Career 
In the early 1960s, Krantz worked as a technician at the Phoebe A. Hearst Museum of Anthropology in Berkeley, California before acquiring a full-time teaching position at Washington State University, where he taught from 1968 until his retirement in 1998. He was a popular professor despite giving notoriously difficult exams, and often ate lunch with students and talked about anthropology, unified field theory in physics, military history, and current events. After his death, a scholarship named after Krantz was established at the University to promote "interest in the fields of physical/biological anthropology, linguistic archaeology, and/or human demography."

In the 1970s, Krantz studied the fossil remains of Ramapithecus, an extinct genus of primates then thought by many anthropologists to be ancestral to humans, although Krantz helped prove this notion false. Krantz's research on Homo erectus was extensive, including studies of phonemic speech and theoretical hunting patterns, and argued that this led to many of the anatomical differences between H. erectus and modern humans. He also wrote an influential paper on the emergence of humans in prehistoric Europe and the development of Indo-European languages, and was the first researcher to explain the function of the mastoid process. His professional work was diverse, including research on the development of Paleolithic stone tools, Neanderthal taxonomy and culture, the Quaternary extinction event, sea level changes, and the evidence of sex in the human fossil record.

In 1996 Krantz was drawn into the Kennewick Man controversy, arguing both in academia and in court that direct lineage to extant human populations could not be demonstrated. In an interview appearing in The New Yorker, Krantz stated his view that "this skeleton cannot be racially or culturally associated with any existing American Indian group" and "the Native Repatriation Act has no more applicability to this skeleton than it would if an early Chinese expedition had left one of its members there." In 2001 he attempted to submit the last paper he wrote before his death, titled "Neanderthal Continuity in View of Some Overlooked Data," although it was rejected by the peer-reviewed journal Current Anthropology, with then editor Benjamin Orlove stating that it did not make enough reference to the most current research.

Bigfoot research
Krantz's specialty as an anthropologist included all aspects of human evolution, but he was best known outside of academia as the first serious researcher to devote his professional energies to the scientific study of Bigfoot, beginning in 1963. Because his cryptozoology research was ignored by mainstream scientists, despite his academic credentials, in a bid to find an audience Krantz published numerous books aimed at casual readers and also frequently appeared in television documentaries, including Arthur C. Clarke's Mysterious World, In Search of..., and Sasquatch: Legend Meets Science.

Krantz's studies of Bigfoot, which he called "Sasquatch," (an Anglicization of the Halkomelem word sásq’ets (meaning "wild man") led him to believe that this was an actual creature. He theorized that sightings were due to small pockets of surviving gigantopithecines, with the progenitor population having migrated across the Bering land bridge, which was later used by humans to enter North America. (Gigantopithecus lived alongside humans but is thought to have gone extinct 100,000 years ago in eastern Asia, while the Bering land bridge existed between 135,000 to 70,000 years BP.)

In January 1985 Krantz tried to formally name Bigfoot by presenting a paper at the meeting of the International Society of Cryptozoology held in Sussex, England, assigning it the binomen Gigantopithecus blacki, although this was not permitted by the International Commission on Zoological Nomenclature because G. blacki was an existing taxon and because the creature was lacking a holotype. Krantz argued that his plaster casts were suitable holotypes, later suggesting G. canadensis as a name, with the caveat that were Sasquatch found to be a member of the Homininae clade, the genus name could be Gigantanthropus in place of Gigantopithecus. Krantz then tried to have his paper, titled "A Species Named from Footprints," published in an academic journal although it was rejected by reviewers.

After seeing footage stills of the Patterson–Gimlin film which appeared on the February 1968 cover of Argosy, Krantz was skeptical, believing the film to be an elaborate hoax, saying "it looked to me like someone wearing a gorilla suit" and "I gave Sasquatch only a 10 percent chance of being real." After years of skepticism, Krantz finally became convinced of Bigfoot's existence after analyzing the "Cripplefoot" plaster casts gathered at Bossburg, Washington in December 1969. Krantz later studied the Patterson–Gimlin film in full, and after taking notice of the creature's peculiar gait and purported anatomical features, such as flexing leg muscles, he changed his mind and became an advocate of its authenticity. While in Bossburg, he also met John Willison Green and the two remained friends until Krantz's death.

The Cripplefoot tracks, left in snow, purportedly showed microscopic dermal ridges (fingerprints) and injuries tentatively identified as clubfoot by primatologist John Napier. Krantz asked Dutch professor A.G. de Wilde of the University of Groningen to examine the prints, who concluded that they were "not from some dead object with ridges in it, but come from a living object able to spread its toes." Krantz also attempted to have both the FBI and Scotland Yard study the dermal ridge patterns, and was told by renowned fingerprint expert John Berry, an editor of the journal Fingerprint Whorld, that Scotland Yard had concluded the prints were "probably real." To his disappointment, a subsequent 1983 article in the journal Cryptozoology, titled "Anatomy and Dermatoglyphics of Three Sasquatch Footprints," was largely ignored.

After constructing biomechanical models of the Cripplefoot casts by calculating their distance, leverage, weight dynamics and distribution, and comparing the data to the track's heel, ankle and toe base, Krantz concluded that the footprints had been left by an animal about 2.44 m (8 ft) tall and weighing roughly 363 kg (800 lb). The morphological detail in the cast, particularly impressions of the thenar eminence muscle, also helped convince Krantz, who argued that a hoax "would require someone quite familiar with the anatomy of the human hand to make the connection between a non-opposable thumb and an absence of the thenar eminence." This culminated in Krantz's first publication on the subject of Bigfoot, with his article "Sasquatch Handprints" appearing in the journal North American Research Notes in 1971.

Shortly before his death, Krantz also examined the Skookum cast. He did not publicly endorse its authenticity, saying in an interview with Outside magazine, "I don't know what it is. I'm baffled. Elk. Sasquatch. That's the choice."

Personal life 
Grover Krantz had one brother, Victor Krantz, who worked as a photographer at the Smithsonian Institution. Krantz was married four times and divorced three times. His first wife was Patricia Howland, whom he married in 1953; he was later married to Joan Brandson in 1959 and Evelyn Einstein in 1964. He married his fourth wife, Diane Horton, on November 5, 1982. He also had a stepson, Dural Horton. Krantz was a road enthusiast and frequently took road trips, traveling to all 48 continental states. In 1984, he received high scores on the Miller Analogies Test and was subsequently accepted into the high IQ society Intertel. On March 3, 1987, Krantz debated Duane Gish on creationism and evolution at Washington State University; the well-publicized three-hour debate was attended by more than 1000 people.

Death and skeleton

On Valentine's Day 2002, Krantz died in his Port Angeles, Washington home from pancreatic cancer after an eight-month battle with the disease. At his request, there was no funeral. Instead, his body was shipped to the body farm at the University of Tennessee Anthropological Research Facility, where scientists study human decay rates to aid in forensic investigations. In 2003, his skeleton arrived at Smithsonian's National Museum of Natural History and was laid to rest in a green cabinet, alongside the bones of his three favorite Irish Wolfhounds – Clyde, Icky, and Yahoo – as was his last request (See "Epilogue" by Dave Hunt of the Smithsonian in Only A Dog).

In 2009, Krantz's skeleton was painstakingly articulated and, along with the skeleton of one of his dogs, included on display in the Smithsonian's "Written in Bone: Forensic Files of the 17th Century Chesapeake" exhibition at the National Museum of Natural History. His bones have also been used to teach forensics and advanced osteology to George Washington University students.

After his death, an editor at NPR named Laura Krantz saw the obituary in the Washington Post and realized that Grover was her cousin. She spent a year documenting his life's work in her podcast Wild Thing and later a children's book The Search for Sasquatch.

Selected bibliography
Non-Sasquatch works include:
 Climatic Races and Descent Groups (North Quincy, MA: Christopher Publishing House, 1980. )
 The Process of Human Evolution (Cambridge, MA: Schenkman Publishing, 1981. )
 Geographical Development of European Languages (New York, NY: Peter Lang Publishing, 1988. )
 Only A Dog (Hong Kong: William Meacham, 2008. )
 Numerous scholarly papers, published in Current Anthropology, American Anthropologist, American Journal of Physical Anthropology, American Journal of Archaeology, American Antiquity, and other journals

Among his works on Sasquatch are:

 The Scientist Looks at the Sasquatch (Moscow: University Press of Idaho, 1977, with anthropologist Roderick Sprague (eds.). )
 The Scientist Looks at the Sasquatch II (Moscow: University Press of Idaho, 1979, with Roderick Sprague (eds.). )
 The Sasquatch and Other Unknown Hominoids (Calgary: Western Publishing, 1984, with archaeologist Vladimir Markotić (eds.). )
 Big Footprints: A Scientific Inquiry Into the Reality of Sasquatch (Boulder, CO: Johnson Books, 1992. )
 Bigfoot Sasquatch Evidence (Surrey, BC: Hancock House, 1999. )
 Numerous scholarly papers, published in Northwest Anthropological Research Notes, Cryptozoology, and other journals

References 

1931 births
2002 deaths
American paleoanthropologists
Bigfoot
Cryptozoologists
University of Utah alumni
University of California, Berkeley alumni
University of Minnesota College of Liberal Arts alumni
Washington State University faculty
Scientists from Salt Lake City
People from Rockford, Illinois
People from Port Angeles, Washington
People from Pullman, Washington
Deaths from pancreatic cancer
Deaths from cancer in Washington (state)
20th-century American anthropologists
Mensans